Joseph H. Manbeck (October 18, 1906 – September 22, 1996) was a Republican member of the Pennsylvania House of Representatives.

References

Republican Party members of the Pennsylvania House of Representatives
1906 births
1996 deaths
20th-century American politicians